is a Japanese professional wrestler contracted with Pro Wrestling Zero1. Sato is also a former mixed martial artist.

Career
A former judoka and amateur wrestler, Sato made his transition to mixed martial arts after meeting Kazunari Murakami and Sanshu Tsubakichi. He joined the Shooto promotion, winning the 1998 All Japan Amateur Shooto Championships over Takashi Okada in the heavyweight class, and later turning professional and gaining two wins over Anthony Netzler and Katsuhisa Fujii. He then retired from MMA in order to start in professional wrestling, debuting in Pro Wrestling ZERO-ONE in 2001.

Championships and accomplishments
All Japan Pro Wrestling
All Asia Tag Team Championship (1 time) – with Hirotaka Yokoi
World Tag Team Championship (1 time) – with Shuji Ishikawa
All Asia Tag Team Title League (2003) – with Hirotaka Yokoi
Big Japan Pro Wrestling
BJW World Strong Heavyweight Championship (1 time)
BJW Tag Team Championship (3 times) – with Daisuke Sekimoto (1), and Shuji Ishikawa (2)
Yokohama Shopping Street 6-Man Tag Team Championship (1 time) – with Daisuke Sekimoto and Hideyoshi Kamitani
Pro Wrestling Illustrated
PWI ranked him #150 of the top 500 singles wrestlers in the PWI 500 in 2016
Pro Wrestling Zero1
NWA Intercontinental Tag Team Championship (7 times) – with Ryoji Sai (2), Yoshihiro Takayama (1), Kamikaze (2), Daisuke Sekimoto (1), and Hideki Suzuki (1)
NWA United National Heavyweight Championship (1 time)
World Heavyweight Championship (6 times)
ZERO1-MAX United States Openweight Championship (1 time)
Fire Festival (2004, 2015)
Furinkazan (2010) – with Kamikaze
Furinkazan (2018) – with Sugi
Passion Cup Tag Tournament (2008) – with Ryoji Sai
Tenryu Project
Tenryu Project World 6-Man Tag Team Championship (1 time, current) – with Kenichiro Arai and Masayuki Kono
World Entertainment Wrestling
WEW World Tag Team Championship (1 time) – with Kamikaze

Mixed martial arts record

|-
| Win
| align="center"| 2-0
| Katsuhisa Fujii
| TKO (punches)
| Shooto - Renaxis 2
| 
| align='center'| 1
| align='center'| 4:05
| Tokyo, Japan
| 
|-
| Win
| align="center"| 1-0
| Anthony Netzler
| Decision (unanimous)
| Shooto - Renaxis 1
| 
| align="center"| 2
| align="center"| 5:00
| Tokyo, Japan
| 
|}

References

External links 

 Zero1 profile
 

1977 births
Japanese male professional wrestlers
Living people
People from Tokyo
Japanese male mixed martial artists
Mixed martial artists utilizing judo
All Asia Tag Team Champions
Tenryu Project World 6-Man Tag Team Champions
21st-century professional wrestlers
WEW World Tag Team Champions
BJW Tag Team Champions
BJW World Strong Heavyweight Champions
Yokohama Shopping Street 6-Man Tag Team Champions